Aleksandr Viktorovich Minchenkov (born 13 January 1989) is a Russian football coach and a former player. He works as a coach at the academy of FC Chertanovo Moscow.

Career statistics

Club

References

Russian footballers
Living people
Footballers from Moscow
1989 births
FC Lokomotiv Moscow players
Russian Premier League players
FC Mordovia Saransk players
FC Baltika Kaliningrad players
Association football forwards
FC Dynamo Bryansk players